Andrew Jackson Tozier Sr. (February 11, 1838 – March 28, 1910) was a first sergeant in the 2nd Maine Volunteer Infantry Regiment and later the color-bearer for the 20th Maine Volunteer Infantry Regiment who was awarded the Medal of Honor for his service at the Battle of Gettysburg during the American Civil War.

Biography

Born in the Purgatory area near the Monmouth/Litchfield line, Andrew was the fifth of seven children. When he was ten years old he moved with his family to Plymouth, Maine, to be near relatives. His father, John H. Tozier was an abusive alcoholic and Andrew ran away from home, perhaps to become a sailor, in his early teens.

In July 1861, Andrew returned home and enlisted from Plymouth in the 2nd Maine Infantry Regiment. In early 1862 he was promoted to corporal and at the Battle of Gaines Mill he was shot in the middle finger and the ankle. Tozier was captured when his regiment fell back and a Confederate surgeon removed the finger and the bullet in his ankle the next day. Tozier was sent to Belle Isle prison in Richmond, and then was paroled a few weeks later. In time, Tozier returned to his regiment and in late May 1863, he was transferred to Company I of the 20th Maine.

A month later, Tozier became the color bearer of his new regiment on the march to Gettysburg when his predecessor, Sgt. Charles Proctor, turned up drunk on the march and was arrested. Andrew was the most senior sergeant in the regiment owing to his previous service in the 2nd Maine which dated back to 1861. As the senior enlisted man, the honor of bearing the regimental colors fell to him.
During the battle on Little Round Top, Tozier stood at the center of the regiment with the regimental flag tucked in his right elbow while he used the rifle of a wounded member of the color guard to return fire on the attacking Confederates. At the conclusion of the fight, regimental commander Joshua Chamberlain offered Tozier a commission as a lieutenant, but Tozier declined.

Tozier was again wounded at the Battle of North Anna on May 26, 1864. This time the bullet struck his head just behind his eye. Most of the bullet exited the skull but a portion remained lodged inside. Despite this latest wound, he continued to serve until his original enlistment term expired on July 15, 1864.

Criminal history

Tozier, along with Lewis Cushman, who was both his half-brother and his uncle, participated in a multi-year crime spree, stealing cattle, clothing and other items across several Maine counties. On August 29, 1865, Tozier, Cushman and an accomplice robbed the clothing store of Michael Larkin in East Livermore, Maine. On April 9, 1868 in Cherryfield, Maine, the two men stole six oxen and drove them to near the state capitol of Augusta before butchering them and selling the meat.

Tozier proved to be an elusive criminal. He was charged with crimes in three different counties but was acquitted in one and had the charges dismissed in another. In 1869, however, prosecutors had enough evidence of his guilt in the clothing store robbery—including the cooperation of Cushman who implicated Tozier—that he pled guilty and was sentenced to five years at hard labor in the state prison. Shortly after he was transferred to the prison, however, Tozier was pardoned of all crimes by the Governor of Maine, who just happened to be his former commander in the 20th Maine, Joshua L. Chamberlain.

Chamberlain not only pardoned his former color sergeant, but he took him and his wife in as boarders at his home in Brunswick, Maine, and helped him to reform. While living with the Chamberlains, Tozier and his wife Lizzie had a daughter whom they named Grace after Chamberlain's daughter, then a teenager.

Postwar years
After living with the Chamberlains for a few years, Tozier moved to Chebeague Island where he worked on a fishing vessel. Eventually, Tozier returned to his childhood home in Monmouth & Litchfield and tried his hand at dairy farming. Plagued by the physical effects of his many war wounds, Tozier worked when he could at a local rake and broom factory or at other odd jobs. He was also active in his local Grand Army of the Republic (GAR) post.

Medal of Honor
In the late 1890s, Joshua Chamberlain wrote to the U.S. War Department recommending that Tozier be awarded a Medal of Honor for his service at Gettysburg in 1863. In 1898, the medal arrived at Tozier's home via parcel post. The citation reads: "At the crisis of the engagement this soldier, a color bearer, stood alone in an advanced position, the regiment having been borne back, and defended his colors with musket and ammunition picked up at his feet." The medal was likely destroyed when his son Andrew, Jr.’s home in Farmingdale, Maine burned down.

In popular culture
Tozier and the story of the 20th Maine are celebrated in The Ghost of Paul Revere's song "Ballad of the 20th Maine", from their album Field Notes Vol.1. The song became the official State Ballad of Maine in 2019. Tozier appears in the 1993 film Gettysburg, portrayed by actor Herb Mitchell.

See also
List of Medal of Honor recipients for the Battle of Gettysburg
List of American Civil War Medal of Honor recipients: T–Z

Notes

1839 births
1910 deaths
People of Maine in the American Civil War
People from Litchfield, Maine
Union Army soldiers
United States Army Medal of Honor recipients
American Civil War recipients of the Medal of Honor
People from Monmouth, Maine